Streptomyces thermovulgaris is a thermophilic bacterium species from the genus of Streptomyces which has been isolated from cow manure. Streptomyces thermovulgaris produces protease.

Further reading

See also 
 List of Streptomyces species

References

External links
Type strain of Streptomyces thermovulgaris at BacDive -  the Bacterial Diversity Metadatabase

thermovulgaris
Bacteria described in 1957